Kafr Qara (also spelled Kafr Qari) is an Arab town in Israel  southeast of Haifa. Kafr Qara holds the record for doctors relative to population size in the country with around 14.8 doctors per 1,000 citizens (2007, with more than 50 medicine students back then), and is also known for recording a high rate of academics and master's degree holders.

History

Mamluk period
An early defter entry  noted that  Kafr Qara had been incorporated into the "Diwan  of the Circassian sultanate" after it had been seized by ‘the Shaykhs of the mountain of Nablus’.

Ottoman period
Kafr Qara was incorporated into the Ottoman Empire in 1517 with the rest of Palestine,  and in the defter no. 610, which was written soon after 1540, the revenue of Kafr Qara was designated to an endowment in Jerusalem; the Madrasah Al-Uthmaniyya. The whole of the revenue of Kafr Qara, a total of 3,400 aspers annually, belonged to this endowment.

In 1859 the population was 450 people, who cultivated 32 feddans of land.
In 1883, the PEF's Survey of Western Palestine (SWP)  described  Kefr Kara as a "good-sized stone village on high ground, with a well to the east, and caves."

A population list from about 1887 showed that  Kiryat Kefr Kara had about 705 inhabitants, all Muslim.

British Mandate
In the 1922 census of Palestine conducted by the British Mandate authorities,  Kufr Qara had a population 776; 767  Muslims and 9 Christians,  where the Christians were 7 Roman Catholics and 2 Maronites. The population  had increased by the 1931 census to 1,109; 4 Christians and 1,105  Muslims, in 198  houses.

In the 1945 statistics, Kafr Qara had a population of 1,510 Muslims, who owned 14,543 dunams of  land. Of this, 227 dunams were for plantations and irrigable land, 11,516 for cereals, while 25 dunams were built-up (urban) land.

Israel
Kafr Qara is part of the Triangle. It is located in the Wadi Ara region, northwest of the Green Line. Most of the inhabitants are Muslim. It is governed by a local council. Kafr Qara now has about 7000 dunams of land left, after land was expropriated by the local authorities and Israeli government for public and military use. WAC, an independent labor association, is located in the village.

Education
In September 2003, a group of local parents founded a bilingual, multicultural elementary school in Kafr Qara, named Hand in Hand – Bridge over the Wadi, or "Bridge over the Wadi". Kafr Qara high school, established in 1970 as a vocational school, is now a comprehensive high school for 10th–12th graders from Kafr Qara and environs. The school has participated in multicultural projects such as Jitli, and offers a joint leadership program for Arab and Jewish teenagers.

Kafr Qara holds the highest record for doctors relative to population size in the country, around 14.8 doctors per 1,000 citizens(2007, with more than 50 medicine student back then), Kafr Qara known as well for recording a high rate of academics and master's degree holders.

Notable people

 Nawaf Massalha, first Muslim to serve on the Israeli cabinet
 Ali Yahya (1947–2014), First Israeli Arab Ambassador of the state of Israel. Appointed ambassador in 1995 to Finland, and 2006 to Greece
 Jamal Zahalka, Arab member of Knesset, Balad chairman

See also
 Ihud Bnei Kafr Qara F.C.
 Arab localities in Israel

References

Bibliography

External links
Welcome To Kafr Qari'
Survey of Western Palestine, Map 8:  IAA, Wikimedia commons  

Arab localities in Israel
Wadi Ara
Local councils in Haifa District